Vladimir Stolyarenko (born 26 February 1961, Leningrad, USSR) is a Russian banker, and was the president and chairman of the executive board of Evrofinance Mosnarbank between June 2006 and 2012.

Early life and education
In 1983, he graduated with honors from the Faculty of Finance and Credit of the Leningrad Institute of Finance and Economics at Voznesensky (now St. Petersburg State University of Economics, St. Petersburg State Economic University).

In 1987, he graduated from the Moscow Financial Institute in the Department of International Monetary and Financial Relations.

In 1987-1993, he was an assistant professor at the Department of Monetary Circulation and Credit and associate professor at the Department of International Economic Relations at St. Petersburg State Economic University.

Career
From 1990 to 1993, Stolyarenko headed the Russian office of the Paris based consulting and auditing firm SECAFI also spelled Alpha-Secafi or Secafi Alpha SA, which is a subsidiary of the December 1983 established Alpha Group owned by Pierre Ferracci.

Stolyarenko was senior vice president of the Leningrad (Saint Petersburg) branch of the bank JSB Imperial from 1993 to 1998 and worked under Andrey Kostin. Imperial focused on oil and natural gas supplies to East Germany and later to Germany including the oil-for-pipes program.

On 28 April 1992 using DM 50 million from a "frozen" VEB account, Tokobank gained an 80.6% stake in Ost-West Handelsbank after the shareholders of Ost-West Handelsbank transferred the stake to Tokobank which was the first privatization of a former sovzagranbank. In May 1998, members of the St. Petersburg "Northern Alliance" including Stolyarenko, the "Kinex" founders Evgeny Malov and Andrey Katkov and their then business partner Gennady Timchenko, held temporary directorships of Tokobank. In 1998, Tokobank owned a 28% stake in the German bank Ost-West Handelsbank.

After working in the bank, Stolyarenko focused on the implementation of investment projects and research activities. Stolyarenko holds PhD in Economics and Doctorate in Law. He also completed a post-graduate program at Harvard Law School, Executive MBA Program at Columbia University Graduate School of Business and London Business School as well as Advance Management Program at Harvard Business School.

Personal life
He is married to Alfiya.

He owns a $10 million apartment at New York's Plaza Hotel, bought in 2007.

Legal claims
In 2019 Stolyarenko got involved in criminal case of FSB colonel Kirill Cherkalin. Ex-banker was charged with fraud and arrested in absentia (he left Russia in 2012). Stolyarenko denied all charges against him. The court later completely excluded the mention of Stolyarenko's name from the descriptive and motivational part of its verdict, as unrelated to the case.

Awards
 In 2007 he was awarded the title of "Best Banker of Russia" (diploma of the 1st degree) according to the magazine "Company", Russia.
 In 2012, awarded with the Order of Honor (for the achieved labor achievements and long-term conscientious work).
 Commendation of the President of Russian Federation Vladimir Putin for his services in the preparation and holding of the meeting of the heads of state and government of the G8 member countries in St. Petersburg, 2006.

Notes

References

Links 
 Vladimir Stolyarenko, profile on Higher School of Economics 
 People | Harvard Law School Program on International Financial Systems
 Владимир Михайлович Столяренко 

Living people
Russian bankers
Recipients of the Order of Honour (Russia)
1961 births
Saint Petersburg University of Economics and Finance alumni